The American Principles Project (APP) is a populist, socially conservative 501(c)(4) think tank founded in 2009 by Robert P. George, Jeff Bell, and Francis P. Cannon. It is chaired by Sean Fieler. It is led by Terry Schilling, the son of the late former U.S. Representative Bobby Schilling. It has opposed Common Core standards and advocated for monetary reform by suggesting a return to the gold standard. The organization has an affiliated super PAC, the American Principles Project PAC, which spent nearly $4 million during the 2020 election cycle.

History 

In 2009, the American legal scholar Robert P. George and political strategist Francis P. Cannon formed APP. In 2010, Jeff Bell became the policy director at APP, alongside Cannon.

In 2011, APP sponsored a Republican presidential primary debate, called the Palmetto Freedom Forum, where panelists Jim DeMint, Steve King, and Robert P. George asked questions.

Following the Republican Party's post-2012 election review, in which the GOP suggested de-emphasizing social issues, APP published a report detailing the importance of social issues to the Republican Party. The report pointed out that Republicans ran almost exclusively on economic issues during the 2012 election to lackluster effect.[9]

In 2018, the APP Foundation released a “Contract with American Families” describing its agenda for 2019. In 2021, APP created a membership program that it called an "NRA for Families."

Super PAC 
The American Principles Project super PAC received $3.2 million from Richard and Elizabeth Uihlein between 2020 and 2022. In 2022, the PAC spent $25,000 on commercials for a school board election in Polk County, Florida.

Policy initiatives

Abortion  
APP is anti-abortion.

Education  
The American Principles Project has been critical of the Common Core standards. 

In 2012, Jane Robbins, Senior Fellow at the American Principles Project, and Emmett McGroarty, Executive Director of APP Education, co-authored a report for the APP and the Pioneer Institute called Controlling Education From The Top: Why Common Core Is Bad For America. APP staff members have testified before state legislatures, encouraging states to withdraw from the Common Core standards. APP argued that the Republican Party would suffer in the 2016 presidential election if it fielded a pro-Common Core candidate.

APP has also opposed the teaching of critical race theory and transgender topics in public schools.

Economics and monetary policy
The American Principles Project has been critical of Federal Reserve System monetary policy and has advocated a return to the gold standard.

In November 2014, Steve Lonegan, Director of Monetary Policy at the American Principles Project, sent a public letter to Federal Reserve Chairman Janet Yellen requesting a meeting to discuss how current monetary policy is "reducing" the standard of living for "average working Americans."

In 2015, American Principles Project funded a conference on economic policy held from August 27–29, 2015, in Jackson Hole, Wyoming, to advocate for hard money monetary policies and an end to government involvement in the money supply. According to associates of hedge fund CEO Robert Mercer interviewed by Bloomberg, Mercer was the main financial backer of the Jackson Hole Summit.

LGBTQ people

APP has funded political campaign ads that reflect the organization's opposition to civil rights protections for LGBTQ people. APP has opposed same-sex marriage and supported restrictions on transgender youth.

In February 2021 Terry Schilling co-authored an op-ed in USA TODAY criticizing the proposed Equality Act, arguing that transgender women athletes would endanger women's sports.

The APP has said that its longterm goal is to eliminate transgender healthcare in its entirety.

In February 2023, the group's president, Terry Schilling, told CNN that they oppose gender-affirming care for all Americans, regardless of age and that they are working with states to introduce and pass bans on it for all ages, but are starting with bans for children since "that's where the vast majority of the American people are right now."

Voting 
APP has worked with Susan B. Anthony Pro-Life America against voting rights legislation. In 2021, the APP PAC contributed $280,000 to Restoration PAC, which ran inaccurate commercials about the For the People Act.

References

External links

 
 Organizational Profile – National Center for Charitable Statistics (Urban Institute)

Conservative organizations in the United States
Non-profit organizations based in Washington, D.C.
Advocacy groups in the United States
Organizations that oppose transgender rights